The Eastern Institute of Technology (EIT) is a government owned tertiary education institution with three campuses: Hawke’s Bay, Auckland, and Gisborne, New Zealand. It is also referred to as EIT Hawke's Bay, EIT Tairāwhiti, and EIT Auckland.  EIT serves as the main regional higher education centre for the Hawke's Bay and Gisborne regions.

It has two faculties. The Faculty of Educations, Humanities, and Health Science includes Te Ūranga Waka – Te Whatukura, Toihoukura, Education and Social Sciences, Health and Sport Science and Nursing schools, and an Ideaschool. The Faculty of Commerce and Technology includes Tourism and Hospitality, English Language Centre, Trades and Technology, Business, Computing and Applied Science schools.

The Eastern Institute of Technology has a  main campus in Taradale, a suburb in Napier. There are also additional campuses in Tairāwhiti and Auckland on Queen Street. EIT also has learning centres in Hastings, Waipukurau, Ruatoria, Tokomaru Bay, Wairoa and a centre in Maraenui, a suburb of the city of Napier.

History
The Eastern Institute of Technology, as it is named today, was officially opened as the Hawke's Bay Community College by the Minister of Education, Phil Amos. Mr Amos laid the foundation stone, on 4 October 1975. In 1987 the Hawke's Bay Community College was renamed the Hawke's Bay Polytechnic. The next name change – to the ”Eastern Institute of Technology" occurred in 1996, the Institute's 21st year. The site of the main campus was donated to the people of Hawke's Bay at the time of the province's centenary by the late Margaret Hetley and in memory of her husband, Arnaud.

EIT had 10,000 students in 2014. Approximately 400 international students study at EIT each year and come from over 40 different countries. It has its own Student Village across the road from the Hawke's Bay campus.

A campus-wide wireless network, EIT Anywhere, allows students to use laptops or other mobile devices on campus. EIT Online, EIT's learning management system, allows students and staff to share information, communicate and interact through online course sites. It is powered by Moodle, and in October 2008 EIT Hawke's Bay hosted the annual Moodle conference. with Martin Dougiamas as keynote speaker. The MoodleMoot was successful and described as "brilliantly run, fantastic speakers".

In January 2011, EIT Hawkes Bay officially merged with Tairawhiti Polytechnic in Gisborne. On 1 April 2020, Eastern Institute of Technology was subsumed into New Zealand Institute of Skills & Technology alongside the 15 other Institutes of Technology and Polytechnics (ITPs).

Courses
In 2015 the teacher student ratio was 14.5:1. EIT aims to meet the demands of the region's key industry groups as well as the wider employment market, and networks closely with the community.  Programmes such as Viticulture, Wine and Food Science and Nursing are unique to the region. 

There are now more than 130 programmes offered at masters, postgraduate, degree, diploma or certificate level, across a range of subject areas including:

Agriculture 
Animal Care and Vet Nursing
Art, Design, Video, Music and Fashion
Business
Computing and Information Technology
Education
English Language Courses
Grapegrowing and Winemaking 
Hair, Beauty and Massage
Health and Development
Horticulture
Maori Studies
Nursing and Health Professions
Trades and Technology
Science
Social Sciences
Sport and Recreation 
Tourism and Hospitality

References

External links
EIT Hawke's Bay
EIT Libraries

Te Pūkenga – New Zealand Institute of Skills and Technology
Napier, New Zealand
Education in the Hawke's Bay Region
1975 establishments in New Zealand
2020 disestablishments in New Zealand
Universities and colleges in New Zealand